Canyon Heights Elementary School is a school located in the district municipality of North Vancouver, British Columbia, Canada. The school has approximately 365 students from kindergarten to grade 7. The school offers various sports for the senior grades such as basketball and volleyball as well as track and field for intermediate grades (4 to 7). There is also a band and strings program. After graduation, students move on to Handsworth Secondary School.

References

External links
https://web.archive.org/web/20121215121926/http://www.nvsd44.bc.ca/schoolsites/canyonheights.aspx
 School District 44 Home Page

Elementary schools in British Columbia
North Vancouver (district municipality)
Educational institutions in Canada with year of establishment missing